Joseph Phillip Natoli (born 1943) is an American academic. He has written on postmodernism, and from 1991 until 2009 was editor of  the Postmodern Culture series published by the State University of New York Press. He is a member of the Truthout Public Intellectual Project, founded by Henry Giroux, and is on the editorial team of Bad Subjects.

Publications

Natoli has written several books, and since 2010 has published in online journals.

Twentieth Century Blake Criticism; Garland, Routledge, (1982, 2017).
Psychocriticism: An Annotated Bibliography; Greenwood Press, (1984).
Psychological Perspectives on Literature: Freudian Dissidents and Non-Freudians: a Casebook; editor, Archon, (1984).
Tracing Literary Theory; University of Illinois Press, (1987).
Literary Theory's Future(s); editor, University of Illinois Press, (1989).
Mots d'ordre; SUNY, (1992).
A Postmodern Reader; ed. with Linda Hutcheon, SUNY, (1993). Trans. into Chinese. 
A Primer To Postmodernity; Blackwell, (1997). Trans. into Chinese and Turkish
Postmodernism: The Key Figures; ed. with Hans Bertens, Blackwell, (2002). Trans. into Japanese and Czech
Occupying Here & Now; Nordgaard Press (2012).
Travels Of A New Gulliver; (2013).
Dark Affinities, Dark Imaginaries: A Mind's Odyssey; SUNY, (2017).

Film and American Culture Series
Hauntings: Popular Film and American Culture 1990–1992; SUNY, (1994).
Speeding to the Millennium: Film and Culture 1993–1995; SUNY, (1998). 
Postmodern Journeys: Film and Culture 1996–1998; SUNY, (2001). 
Memory's Orbit: Film and Culture 1999–2000; SUNY, (2003).
This Is a Picture and Not the World: Movies and a Post-9/11 America; SUNY, (2007).

References

Further reading 
Hoppenstand, Gary. "Editorial: The Way of Knowing." The Journal of Popular Culture, vol. 39, no. 3, 2006. 
"Conversations with Scholars of American Popular Culture: Featured Guest: Joseph Natoli." Americana:The Journal of American Popular Culture 1900 to Present, 2007.
Mohsen, Abdelmoumen. "Pr. Joseph Natoli: "We need to kill the human"." American Herald Tribute, May 2016.

1943 births
Living people
American male writers